Kitty Rhoades (née Richie) (April 7, 1951 – June 18, 2016) was an American politician. She served as a member of the Wisconsin State Assembly, where she represented the 30th district, before serving as Secretary of the Wisconsin Department of Health Services.

Early life and education 
Born in Hudson, Wisconsin, Rhoades received a bachelor's degree from the University of Wisconsin–River Falls and a master's degree in education from Illinois State University.

Career 
Rhoades worked as an educator, small business owner, and consultant. In 1998, she was elected to the Wisconsin State Assembly as a Republican.

In the 1990s, Rhoades proposed the term Winnesota to describe Wisconsin's St. Croix and Pierce Counties, which border Minnesota and are within the  U.S. Census Bureau's Minneapolis-Saint Paul Metropolitan Area. According to Rhoades, "I still call my area Winnesota. We are in Wisconsin, but it sure is hard to remember it."

Rhoades retired from the state Assembly in 2010, and took a position with the administration of then-Governor Scott Walker in 2011 as Deputy Secretary of the Department of Health Services. In February 2013, following the resignation of Dennis Smith, she was appointed Secretary.

Death 
Rhoades died on June 18, 2016, in Madison, Wisconsin from pneumonia.

References

External links 
 Follow the Money - Kitty Rhoades
2008 2006 2004 2002 2000 1998 campaign contributions
Campaign 2008 campaign contributions at Wisconsin Democracy Campaign

1951 births
2016 deaths
People from Hudson, Wisconsin
University of Wisconsin–River Falls alumni
Illinois State University alumni
Businesspeople from Wisconsin
State cabinet secretaries of Wisconsin
Women state legislators in Wisconsin
21st-century American politicians
21st-century American women politicians
20th-century American businesspeople
20th-century American women
Republican Party members of the Wisconsin State Assembly